Nonso Amadi (born September 1, 1995) is a Nigerian singer, songwriter and music producer. He is a self-taught songwriter and music producer who embarked on his music career in 2012, while at Covenant University, where he studied chemical engineering.

Early life 
Nonso Amadi was born on September 1, 1995, to Nigerian parents. He is the third among a family of seven and grew up in Nigeria before moving to United Kingdom.

Education 
He attended St Gregory’s College Ikoyi, Lagos and graduated in 2009. He studied chemical engineering in Covenant University, and in 2014 he continued his studies at Swansea University United Kingdom. He holds a master's degree from McMaster University, Canada.

Career
In 2015, Nonso Amadi released his first EP, Alone, and a few months later he released a follow up single, "Tonight", which was a hit worldwide. He has so far garnered international attention and collaboration with artists such as Banky W., Maleek Berry anMI, d Juls within the first year of his professional career. In December 2017, he held his first 'Homecoming Concert' in Nigeria.

In 2017, he released a joint EP with fellow singer Odunsi the engine titled WAR.

In 2019, Amadi released another solo EP titled Free featuring collaborations with Mr. Eazi. and Simi.

After a three-year hiatus, Nonso Amadi returned to the music scene in 2022 with a new single titled Foreigner followed by another single featuring the Canadian Rnb duo Majid Jordan titled Different.

References

1995 births
Living people
Nigerian male singer-songwriters
Covenant University alumni
Nigerian alté singers